PopLlama Records is an independent record label founded by record producer Conrad Uno in Seattle, Washington, in 1984. After making several of his own demos in his basement studio, Uno would produce The Young Fresh Fellows' debut album The Fabulous Sounds of the Pacific Northwest at the band's request. When the band decided to release their own albums, Uno founded PopLlama Records to help, releasing their debut album as well as the follow up Topsy Turvy. Uno would continue to produce, usually for friends, and release albums through PopLlama throughout the 1980s.

PopLlama has been credited as the "label [that] helped start the Seattle scene", along with other Pacific Northwest labels such as C/Z Records, Regal Select Records, Estrus Records and EMpTy Records, due to the release of albums by the Young Fresh Fellows and The Posies in the 1980s. The label has also released albums by groups such as Dharma Bums, Nevada Bachelors, the Presidents of the United States of America, the Squirrels and the Smugglers among others.

Roster
 Capping Day
 Dharma Bums
 Fastbacks
 Girl Trouble
 Jimmy Silva
 Nevada Bachelors
 The Pickets
 PK Dwyer
 The Posies
 The Presidents of the United States of America
 Pure Joy
 Rally Go!
 Red Dress
 Richard Peterson
 The Smugglers
 The Squirrels
 The Walkabouts
 The Young Fresh Fellows

See also
 List of record labels

References

External links
 

Alternative rock record labels
American independent record labels
 
Record labels established in 1984
Companies based in Seattle